Jolly Frolics is a UPA animated cartoon series. Thirty-eight films were produced in the series, theatrically released from 1948 to 1959, pioneering the use of limited animation. 

Due to their mature themes, they weren't considered animation appropriate for younger audiences, and as a result have never aired on television (with some exceptions, like the cartoons with The Fox and the Crow, Mr. Magoo and Gerald McBoing-Boing plus some others which were more family-friendly in tone, as they were aired in the package TV series Totally Tooned In). They were released on DVD by TCM in 2012 with a MOD re-release in 2014.

Filmography 

Robin Hoodlum 12/23/48 fc
The Magic Fluke 3/27/49 fc
The Ragtime Bear 9/8/49 m
Punchy De Leon 1/12/50 fc
Spellbound Hound 3/16/50 m
The Miner's Daughter 5/25/50 
Giddyap 7/27/50 
Gerald McBoing-Boing 11/2/50 g
The Popcorn Story 11/30/50
The Family Circus 1/25/51
Late Registration 8/3/51
Georgie and the Dragon 9/27/51
The Wonder Gloves 11/29/51
The Oompahs 1/24/52
Rooty Toot Toot 3/27/52 
Willie the Kid 6/26/52
Pete Hothead 9/25/52
Madeline 11/27/52
Little Boy With a Big Horn 3/26/53
The Emperor's New Clothes 4/30/53 
Christopher Crumpet 6/25/53
Gerald McBoing-Boing's Symphony  7/5/53 g Sparky
The Unicorn in the Garden 9/24/53
The Tell Tale Heart 12/27/53
Bringing Up Mother 1/14/54
Ballet-Oop 2/11/54 
The Man on the Flying Trapeze 4/8/54
Fudget's Budget 6/17/54 
How Now Boing Boing 9/9/54 g
Spare the Child 1/27/55
Four Wheels No Brakes 3/24/55
Baby Boogie 5/19/55
Christopher Crumpet's Playmate 9/8/55
The Rise of Duton Lang 12/1/55
Gerald McBoing! Boing! On Planet Moo 2/9/56 g
The Jaywalker 5/31/56
Trees and Jamaica Daddy 1/30/58 hh
Sailing and Village Band 2/27/58 hh
Spring and Saganaki 10/16/58 hh
Picnics Are Fun and Dino's Serenade 1/16/59 hh

See also
 List of UPA cartoons
Color Rhapsodies
Phantasies
Silly Symphony
Color Classics
Happy Harmonies
Looney Tunes
Merrie Melodies

Film series introduced in 1948
1948 films
1959 disestablishments in the United States
UPA series and characters
Animated film series